"Last Goodbye" is a song by Swedish band Da Buzz. It reached number one on the Swedish Singles Chart on 9 March 2006. It is the first single from the album of the same name and was released as a three track CD single by Bonnier Music on 22 February 2006.

Track listing
"Last Goodbye" (Radio Edit) – 3:15
"Last Goodbye" (von der Burg Radio Edit) – 3:13
"Last Goodbye" (von der Burg Extended) – 5:00

Charts

Weekly charts

Year-end charts

References

2006 singles
2006 songs
Da Buzz songs
Number-one singles in Sweden
Songs written by Per Lidén